Irish Freedom was launched in November 1910, as an Irish monthly publication of the Irish Republican Brotherhood movement. It lasted for four years until suppressed in 1914 by the British administration in Ireland.

It was founded in by Tom Clarke in 1910 with financial help from John Daly and Patrick McCartan.

The title was refounded in 1939, again as a monthly publication, by the Connolly Club and published in London.

The newspaper Saoirse Irish Freedom which replaced the Republican Bulletin, the official paper of the Republican Sinn Féin in May 1987 takes its name from the newspaper.

Notable contributors
Contributors included:
Bulmer Hobson
P. S. O'Hegarty
Terence MacSwiney
Patrick Pearse
Ernest Blythe
Piaras Béaslaí
Roger Casement
Brian O'Higgins
Mairin Mitchell

References

External links
The Fenian ideal and Irish nationalism, 1882-1916
Movements for Political & Social Reform, 1870–1914
An Irishman's Diary - The Irish Times - Mon, Aug 10, 2009
A Short History of Ireland By John Ranelagh

Newspapers published in Ireland
Irish Republican Brotherhood
Newspapers established in 1910
Publications disestablished in 1914
1910 establishments in Ireland
Irish republican newspapers